Al Hmadah Club (Arabic: نادي الحماده السعودي) is a Saudi Arabian football club established in 1971. It is based in Al-Ghat.

Honours
Saudi Second Division: (1) 2000–01

Football clubs in Saudi Arabia